Light My Fire is the twenty-first studio album by Brazilian jazz pianist and singer Eliane Elias. It was released on May 31, 2011 by Concord Picante. On this record she performs mostly Brazilian songs, but also adds a couple of jazz standards and one or two famous rock and pop compositions. The Elias's song "What About the Heart (Bate Bate)" received a Grammy nomination for "Best Brazilian Song" in September 2011.

Reception
Matt Collar of Allmusic wrote, "Brazilian jazz pianist, vocalist Eliane Elias' 2011 Concord Picante debut Light My Fire is a romantic and sultry affair that showcases her knack for traditional bossa nova tunes as well as few inspired covers. Joining Elias here are a few special guests including Brazil legend Gilberto Gil, who sings on three tracks, as well as singer Amanda Brecker (Elias' daughter with trumpeter Randy Brecker) who appears on "Toda Menina Baiana." Also backing Elias are a bevy of talented individuals, including producer/bassist Marc Johnson, guitarist Oscar Castro-Neves, percussionists Rafael Barata and Paulo Braga, and trumpeter Brecker."

Charles J. Gans of The Press of Atlantic City stated, "Light My Fire" showcases her talents as a four-tool player—singer, pianist, arranger and songwriter—with a romantic collection of classic Brazilian songs, American pop and jazz standards set to Brazilian grooves, and original tunes... Elias' personal Brazilian jazz blend shines through on her own compositions with lyrics in both Portuguese and English".

Track listing

Personnel
 Eliane Elias – piano, vocals
 Randy Brecker – trumpet, flugelhorn
 Lawrence Feldman – flute
 Oscar Castro-Neves – acoustic guitar
 Romero Lubambo – acoustic guitar
 Ross Traut – electric guitar
 Marc Johnson – bass guitar
 Rafael Barata – drums, percussion
 Paulo Braga – drums
 Pedrito Martinez – congas
 Marivaldo Dos Santos – percussion
 Paulo Braga – percussion
 Amanda Brecker – vocals
 Gilberto Gil – vocals

Chart positions

References

External links

2011 albums
Eliane Elias albums